David Frederick Skea (February 1871 – c. 1950) was a Scottish footballer.

Football career
He began his career with his hometown club, Arbroath, before joining Aston Villa, where he made just one appearance in the English Football League. After a spell back in Scotland with Dundee Thistle, he moved to Darwen, where again he was restricted to a single Football League game before a move to Bury of the Lancashire League.

In 1894 he joined Leicester Fosse, where he spent two seasons as a regular in the team, making 45 League appearances and scoring 28 goals. In the 1894–95 season, he was the top scorer in the Football League Second Division.

After leaving Filbert Street, he played for Swindon Town and New Brompton of the Southern League.

References

1871 births
1950s deaths
People from Arbroath
Scottish footballers
Gillingham F.C. players
Swindon Town F.C. players
Darwen F.C. players
Aston Villa F.C. players
Bury F.C. players
Leicester City F.C. players
Arbroath F.C. players
Southern Football League players
Association football forwards
Footballers from Angus, Scotland